San Antonino may refer to any of three towns and municipalities in Oaxaca, Mexico:

San Antonino Castillo Velasco
San Antonino El Alto
San Antonino Monte Verde